Jonathan D. Cooper (born August 23, 1967) is a Canadian-American professional ice hockey coach who is the head coach for the Tampa Bay Lightning of the National Hockey League (NHL). Cooper won back-to-back Stanley Cup championships in 2020 and 2021 as the Lightning head coach, and is currently the longest-tenured coach in the NHL.

Early life
Cooper was born in Prince George, British Columbia. He played high school hockey at Notre Dame in Wilcox, Saskatchewan. He graduated with a Bachelor of Business Administration from Hofstra University in 1989. Despite his prior lacrosse experience being that of the box variety, he was a field lacrosse letterman in each of the first four years of John Danowski's tenure as the varsity program's head coach. An attackman who eventually transitioned into a midfielder, Cooper scored 74 goals with 25 assists for 99 points and was a member of East Coast Conference championship teams as a junior and senior. He also played one year of club hockey during his time at Hofstra.

He graduated from Thomas M. Cooley Law School in Lansing, Michigan. Cooper practiced law for five years and was a public defender off and on for two years while also maintaining his private practice. Cooper started playing hockey again while attending law school, ultimately leading to his first experience coaching hockey at Lansing Catholic High School.

Coaching career

Junior teams
Cooper began his coaching career in 1999–2000 with Lansing Catholic High School and led the team to its first regional hockey championship in 25 years. The following season (2000–01) he served as an assistant with the Capital Centre Pride of the North American Hockey League, the only time during his coaching career Cooper was an assistant. During the 2001–02 season, Cooper was the head coach of the Metro Jets in the North American 3 Hockey League and led the Jets to the Silver Cup – the USA Hockey National Junior B Championship. In 2002–03, Cooper coached the Honeybaked Midget Major AAA team.

In 2003, Cooper returned to the North American Hockey League (NAHL) to coach the expansion Texarkana Bandits. In 2004–05 he was named the NAHL Coach of the Year after leading the Bandits to a 36-15-5 record. Cooper continued with the Bandits franchise when it relocated to St. Louis in 2006–07. During the 2006–07 season, the Bandits captured the Robertson Cup as league champion. The following season the Bandits would once again capture the Robertson Cup. Additionally, Cooper won his second NAHL Coach of the Year that season. Cooper spent a total of five seasons coaching in the NAHL before moving on to coach the Green Bay Gamblers of the United States Hockey League. In his five seasons coaching the Bandits franchise in the NAHL, Cooper compiled an overall record of 198-74-18.

Cooper was the coach of the United States Hockey League (USHL)'s Green Bay Gamblers starting in 2008. He led the team in 2008–09 and 2009–10 to a combined record of 84–27–9. In 2010, the team won the Clark Cup for the League's championship and Cooper was named USHL Coach of the Year.  He is the only coach to win a championship in all three tiers of junior hockey in the United States.

Pro hockey

In 2010, Cooper was hired by the Tampa Bay Lightning to coach the Norfolk Admirals, the team's American Hockey League (AHL) affiliate. During the 2011–12 season, the Admirals won the Calder Cup as the AHL's champions.  The Admirals also set a North American professional sports record for the longest regular season winning streak at 28 games in a row.  Additionally, Cooper won the 2012 Louis A. R. Pieri Memorial Award as the AHL's most outstanding head coach. 

For the 2012–13 season, Cooper became the head coach of the Syracuse Crunch after the Lightning changed their AHL affiliation. In 65 games with the Crunch, Cooper led the team to a 39–18–3–5 record, the best in the AHL at the time of his promotion.

Tampa Bay Lightning
On March 25, 2013, following the dismissal of head coach Guy Boucher, the Tampa Bay Lightning announced that Cooper would become head coach. After leading the Lightning to their best season in franchise history in points (108) and wins (50), Cooper coached the Tampa Bay Lightning to their second Prince of Wales Trophy as the Eastern Conference champion. The Lightning lost to the Chicago Blackhawks in six games in the 2015 Stanley Cup Finals.

On March 22, 2016, Cooper recorded his 143rd win as the Lightning's head coach. The win moved Cooper past Terry Crisp for second all-time in wins in franchise history. On November 8, 2017, Cooper recorded his 200th career win as head coach of the Lightning. Cooper joined John Tortorella as the only coaches in franchise history to record 200 wins. On January 7, 2018, Cooper was named as head coach of the Atlantic Division for the 63rd National Hockey League All-Star Game, which was played at Amalie Arena in Tampa, Florida. The selection was because the Lightning were the team with the highest points percentage in the Atlantic Division. On March 30, 2018, Cooper recorded his 240th career NHL win against the New York Rangers at Madison Square Garden. The win moved Cooper past John Tortorella for most wins in franchise history.

On January 5, 2019, Cooper was named to the 2019 National Hockey League All-Star Game. This was Cooper's second consecutive selection to the NHL All-Star game. On March 18, 2019, Cooper coached the Lightning to their first Presidents' Trophy in franchise history with a victory over the visiting Arizona Coyotes at Amalie Arena. On March 21, 2019, Cooper recorded his 300th career NHL win in a 6–3 Lightning win over the Carolina Hurricanes at PNC Arena. On March 26, 2019, Cooper signed a multi-year contract extension to remain as the head coach of the Lightning. On April 1, 2019, Cooper coached the Lightning to their 60th win of the season. With the win, the Lightning became only the 3rd team in NHL history to reach the mark and Cooper became the second coach in NHL history to coach a team to 60 wins, joining Scotty Bowman. Tampa Bay would go on to win 62 games during the 2018-19 regular season, tying the 1995-96 Detroit Red Wings for the most wins in a season in NHL history. The Lightning that season were swept in the first round by the Columbus Blue Jackets, making them the first team to win the Presidents' Trophy and not win a single post-season game in the same year.

On September 28, 2020, Cooper led the Lightning to franchise's second Stanley Cup, when they beat the Dallas Stars in six games. Cooper stated after the win that the team drew inspiration from the Virginia Cavaliers men's basketball program. Similar to the Lightning's playoff defeat in 2019, top-seeded Virginia was defeated in their opening game by a 16th seed in the 2018 national tournament, the first such occurrence of a 16 vs. 1 upset in the history of the NCAA Division I men's basketball tournament. One year later, Virginia won the national championship.

On May 30, 2021, Cooper coached the Lightning to a 2–1 win over the Carolina Hurricanes at PNC Arena in his 100th career NHL playoff game.

On July 7, 2021, Cooper led the reigning champions to the Lightning's third Stanley Cup when they beat the Montreal Canadiens in five games. Cooper was the first coach to win back-to-back Stanley Cups since Mike Sullivan accomplished this feat with the Pittsburgh Penguins winning in 2016 and 2017.

On December 9, 2021, Cooper recorded his 400th career win in a victory over the Toronto Maple Leafs at Scotiabank Arena. Cooper set the record for the least amount of games coached to reach 400 wins in NHL history, which came in his 659th game.

On April 1, 2022, Cooper coached in his 700th career NHL game. His 426 wins at the time of reaching the milestone are the most in NHL history among head coaches through their first 700 games.

International
On November 13, 2015, Team North America general manager, Peter Chiarelli, named Cooper as an assistant coach for the 2016 World Cup of Hockey under Team North America head coach Todd McLellan.

On April 11, 2017, Hockey Canada named Cooper as the head coach of Canada's men's national ice hockey team for the 2017 IIHF World Championship tournament. Cooper was joined by assistant coaches Gerard Gallant, Dave Hakstol, and Dave King. On May 21, 2017, Cooper coached Team Canada to a silver medal. Team Canada lost to Team Sweden 2–1 in a shootout.

On August 9, 2021, Cooper was named head coach of Team Canada for the 2022 Olympic Winter Games in Beijing but ultimately did not participate due to the NHL pulling out of the competition because of the COVID-19 pandemic.

Personal life
Cooper is a dual citizen of the United States and Canada. Cooper's mother was American, while his father was Canadian. Growing up, Cooper's family were fans of the Toronto Maple Leafs. Cooper and his wife Jessie have twin daughters and a son.

On September 16, 2016, the creation of the annual Coop's Catch for Kids charity fishing tournament was announced in partnership with the V Foundation. The tournament's purpose is for benefiting pediatric cancer research at Moffitt Cancer Center and All Children's Hospital. Each year, anglers are treated to an exciting day of fishing and fundraising alongside Lightning players and coaches. The annual catch-and-release inshore grand slam tournament pairs Lightning celebrities on a guided boat with two participants. The inaugural event was held on October 11, 2016 and to date has raised over $750,000.

Head coaching record

NHL

* – mid-season replacement

AHL

* – promoted to Tampa Bay on March 25, 2013

Coaching honors
 Stanley Cup champion (NHL): , 
 NHL All-Star Game (NHL): 2018, 2019
 Jack Adams Award finalist (NHL): , 
 Calder Cup champion (AHL): 2011–12
 Pieri Memorial Award (AHL): 2011–12
 USHL Coach of the Year: 2009-10
 Clark Cup (USHL): 2009–10
 Robertson Cup (NAHL): 2006–07, 2007–08
 NAHL coach of the year: 2007–08, 2004–05

References

External links
 

1967 births
Living people
Athol Murray College of Notre Dame alumni
Canada men's national ice hockey team coaches
Canadian expatriate ice hockey people
Hofstra Pride men's lacrosse players
Hofstra University alumni
Ice hockey people from British Columbia
Norfolk Admirals
Public defenders
Sportspeople from Prince George, British Columbia
Stanley Cup champions
Stanley Cup championship-winning head coaches
Syracuse Crunch
Tampa Bay Lightning coaches
Western Michigan University Cooley Law School alumni